Jakob Erckrath de Bary (10 March 1864 – 14 August 1938) was a German fencer. He won a gold medal in the team sabre event at the 1906 Intercalated Games.

References

External links
 

1864 births
1938 deaths
German male fencers
Olympic fencers of Germany
Olympic gold medalists for Germany
Medalists at the 1906 Intercalated Games
Fencers at the 1906 Intercalated Games
Fencers at the 1908 Summer Olympics
Fencers at the 1912 Summer Olympics
Sportspeople from Offenbach am Main